Gudi Gantalu is a 1964 Indian Telugu-language drama film directed by V. Madhusudhana Rao. It stars N. T. Rama Rao and Krishna Kumari, with music composed by Ghantasala. The film was produced by Sunderlal Nehata and Doondy. It is a remake of the Tamil film Aalayamani (1962).

Plot 
Vasu is an affluent gentleman who does not have anyone for family. He had lost his parents at an early age and grew up in the presence of servants in his huge bungalow. Because of this, he has various psychological imbalances. He has a close relative named Bhadrayya who wants his daughter Subhadra to marry into Vasu's vast wealth and estate. Subhadra herself is in love with her classmate Hari. However, Hari and Kasthuri are in love with each other. She is the daughter of Subbayya who works as a clerk in Vasu's estate. Hari's father had died serving in Vasu's estate and as such Vasu and Hari have a brotherly bond. He supports the latter's education and treats him like his own brother.

Kasthuri has an elder sister named Kalyani who loves Bhadrayya's son Krishna. Bhadrayya does not approve of this marriage because of the wealth and status differences. Krishna and Kalyani plan to get married anyway and, out of respect for Bhadrayya, Vasu helps them financially. Vasu falls in love at first sight with Kasthuri at this wedding with no knowledge of the love between Hari and Kasthuri. Hari decides to sacrifice his love for the sake of Vasu, who looked after him. He convinces Kasthuri and the engagement between Vasu and Kasthuri is done. Bhadrayya is not happy with the turn of events and executes a car accident involving Kasthuri. Vasu loses his two legs to paralysis in a successful attempt at rescuing her.

Vasu's psychological issues start showing up after he is confined to a wheelchair, leading him to be possessive of Kasthuri. He gets suspicious of an affair between her and Hari after finding out that they were once lovers. Eventually, he attempts to kill Hari by pushing him off a cliff into the sea beneath but falls into it himself. Vasu is rescued by some fishermen and he gets his thoughts back in order, feeling extremely guilty for suspecting Hari, going as far as to try and kill him. He returns to his estate in the disguise of a beggar to see how Hari and Kasthuri are doing. Hari is married to Subhadra and Kasthuri stays single, considering herself windowed. She is dedicated in her service towards a statue of Vasu, proving that the affair was all in Vasu's head. Kasthuri had decided to end her life after Hari's wedding once she hands over the estate and wealth to Hari. Vasu comes to learn this and attempts to rescue her with his limp legs. With time fast running out, his desperation returns life to his legs. He rescues Kasthuri at the brink of the same cliff he fell off and requests her to forgive him. The film ends with the marriage of Vasu and Kasthuri.

Cast

Music 

Music was composed by Ghantasala.

Awards 
Nandi Awards
 Third Best Feature Film - Bronze - Nehata & Doondi (1964)

References

External links 
 

1964 films
Telugu remakes of Tamil films
Films directed by V. Madhusudhana Rao
Films scored by Ghantasala (musician)
Indian drama films
1960s Telugu-language films
Nandi Award winners